Mian Mahalleh may refer to:
 Mian Mahalleh, Gilan
 Mian Mahalleh, Mazandaran